Earned wage access (EWA), can be referred to as instant pay, earned income, early wage access, accrued wage access or on-demand pay. The official UK government term is Employer Salary Advance Scheme. It is a financial service offered to employees, mostly low-wage and hourly workers, being given access to some of their accrued wages before the end of their payroll cycle.

Earned wage access technology can be implemented in various ways: automatically loaded onto a prepaid card, deposited via ACH onto a user's existing direct deposit, or, in a bifocal approach, accrued earnings are transferred into a bank account facilitated by the EWA provider. Earned wage access providers have been positioned as an ethical solution to payday lenders as they typically charge a small flat fee rather than interest.

In America, 20% of all hourly staff are expected to be paid this way by 2023, with many large employers like Walmart and Mcdonald's already offering it.

History 
Earned wage access programs began to reach the market in the 2010s, due to the receding number of Americans who had access to credit and traditional banking. By integrating with payroll, these promised to usher in a fairer and more inclusive era of personal finance. 

In August 2016, Uber pioneered EWA in a partnership with Green Dot by allowing drivers to request their earnings after each drive in exchange for a small payment.

In July 2018, ADP, the largest payroll provider in America, began offering an EWA solution in their marketplace through DailyPay.

In May 2019, Lyft introduced a similar feature to its drivers in a partnership with Mastercard.

UK Market 
Theoretically, 'EWA' has even more potential in the UK where the typical pay cycle is monthly, rather than bi-monthly like in the US.

Repayment 
As 'EWA' exists today, users will still receive the entirety of their paycheck at the end of each payroll cycle. At the end of each payroll cycle, however, the advancements made to the user are subtracted from the direct deposit account noted by the user to repay the debt. EWA is stated to be different than a payday loan as the repayment of the debt almost always is made without interest.

Benefits 
Earned wage access is promoted as bringing income more inline with expenses, helping workers to avoid cashflow issues that could result in them taking out high-interest debt. The academic consensus supports this claim, with research finding better financial outcomes for users vs non-users. 

There is also a moral argument made by some that, instead of employers benefiting from the cash flow advantages of paying in arrears, staff are entitled to the pay they've already earned. 

Many 'EWA' providers also highlight the benefits to the employer, including quicker recruitment, better staff retention, a more motivated workforce and a greater staff appetite for overtime and extra shifts. Marketing claims vary across the industry, from reducing staff turnover by 50% to increasing shift uptake by 26%.

Criticism 
While the research does show a generally positive impact on employee well-being and financial health, the quality and morality of the service does depend on the individual provider.   

In response, States like New York and Nevada have attempted to regulate earned wage access providers by requiring them to be licensed as lenders.

In the UK, the government is broadly optimistic about the sector and appears to be encouraging take-up. This is possibly in response to several think tanks and charities throwing their reputation behind the concept.

Risks

For consumers 
Consumer risk is highly dependent on the specific strategy the EWA provider chooses to take when offering the advances. Some users have been forced into overdraft as they were allowed to advance more than they received in their paycheck. Some EWA providers charge a fee for the advance, which can effectively charge users an APR of over 365% for their advances. Most reputable providers cap advances well below total income and charge no interest at all.

For EWA providers 
EWA providers are held responsible for recollecting the advances they make the consumers. As such, they face risk if they advance too much to the user and risk the user defaulting. All in all, however, EWA providers face dramatically lower risk than other credit providers as the advances they make are backed by hours the loan recipient has already worked towards.

References 

Employment compensation
Informal finance
Financial technology
Financial technology companies
Wages and salaries